Gringoire can refer to:
Pierre Gringoire
Gringoire (newspaper) a French newspaper between 1928 and 1944